Agostino Carraro (1 December 1910 – 12 January 1995) was an Italian stage, television and film actor.

Life and career 
Born in Milan, Carraro started acting at young age in several amateur stage companies. In 1952 he made his film debut, in the Duilio Coletti's war film I sette dell'Orsa Maggiore. The same year, Carraro became first actor at the Piccolo Teatro in Milan, starting a long and critically appreciated collaboration with the director Giorgio Strehler. Carraro is also well known for his television work, which include some very successful RAI miniseries, particularly Sandro Bolchi's Il Mulino del Po, I Miserabili and I promessi sposi and  Vittorio Cottafavi's A come Andromeda.

Partial filmography 

 Falsehood (1952) - Fabrizio
 I sette dell'Orsa maggiore (1953) - Commander
 I quattro del getto tonante (1955) - Colonnello
 A Qualcuna Piace Calvo (1960) - John Bryll
 Constantine and the Cross (1961) - Emperor Maximianus
 Day by Day, Desperately (1961) - Pietro
 Imperial Venus (1962) - Canova
 The Terrorist (1963) - Smith De Ceva
 Our Men in Bagdad (1966)
 The Vatican Affair (1968) - Il maggiordomo
 Orgasmo (1969) - Brion Sanders
 The Lady of Monza (1969) - Monsignor Barrea
 La Faute de l'abbé Mouret (1970) - Dr. Pascal
 The Cat o' Nine Tails (1971) - Prof. Fulvio Terzi
 Le belve (1971) - The Minister (segment "La voce del sangue")
 Story of a Cloistered Nun (1973) - Father of Carmela
 Lovers and Other Relatives (1974) - Giustino Bellotto
 Zig-Zag (1975) - Le ministre
 Vergine e di nome Maria (1975) - Il vescovo
 Illustrious Corpses (1976) - Chief of Police
 Werewolf Woman (1976) - Count Neseri
 Per amore (1976) - Alberto's Father
 Italian Night (1987) - Ettore Melandri (final film role)

References

External links 
 

1910 births
1995 deaths
Italian male film actors 
Italian male television actors 
Italian male stage actors
Male actors from Milan
20th-century Italian male actors